"Everything Is Allowed" is a song by Nigerian-born Australian singer-songwriter and dancer Timomatic. It was released as a digital download in Australia on November 10, 2013. It is the third single from his yet-to-be-titled second studio album, originally due in 2014.

The song was co-written and co-produced by Jimmy Joker, who has previously worked with Jennifer Lopez, Nicole Scherzinger and Dizzee Rascal as well as Timomatic's frequent collaborators, Geraldo Sandell and Johnny Powers Severin.

Track listings

Promotion 
From August 2013, Timomatic was a judge on Australia's Got Talent, with the live shows airing in September. Timomatic premiered his new single "Everything Is Allowed" during the series final, which aired on November 12.

On November 22, Timomatic performed the song on Today.

Later that night, he promoted the song at 'The Marquee', Sydney. On November 29, Timomatic performed the song during his one-night-only show at The Palms at Crown.

Video 
The video for "Everything Is Allowed" was released on 20 November 2013 via his VEVO account. and quickly appeared on other pop music websites, including MTV, ARIA and amp radio.

The video features Timomatic partying throughout. The video was also noted for a bright pink jacket Timomatic wears.

Chart performance 
Despite the live performance exposure on the final Australia's Got Talent, the single debuted and peaked at number 48.

Weekly charts

Release history

References 

2013 songs
2013 singles
Timomatic songs
Sony Music Australia singles
Songs written by Geraldo Sandell
Songs written by Jimmy Thörnfeldt